Saladino is a surname.  Notable people with the name include:

 Gaspar Saladino (1927–2016), American letterer and logo designer 
 Irving Saladino (born 1983), Panamanian long jumper
 Joseph P. Saladino (born 1993), American YouTube personality and prankster, known as Joey Salads
 Joseph S. Saladino (born 1962), New York politician
 Tyler Saladino (born 1989), American baseball player